"Dolce far niente" (literally “sweet doing nothing, sweet idleness”) is an Italian saying.

See also 

 Critique of work
 Dolce far niente (poem)
 Dolce vita
 Idleness

References

Italian language